Carmen Basilio (born Carmine Basilio, April 2, 1927 – November 7, 2012)  was an American professional boxer who was the world champion in both the welterweight and middleweight divisions, beating Sugar Ray Robinson for the latter title. An iron-chinned pressure fighter, Basilio was a combination puncher who had great stamina and eventually wore many of his opponents down with vicious attacks to the head and body.

In 1957, The Ring magazine named Basilio Fighter of the Year, while the Boxing Writers Association of America (BWAA) named him Fighter of the Year in 1955 and 1957. He also holds the distinction of being in The Ring magazine's Fight of the Year in five consecutive years (1955-59), a feat unmatched by any other boxer. In 2002, Basilio was voted by The Ring magazine as the 40th greatest fighter of the last 80 years. He was inducted into the International Boxing Hall of Fame in the inaugural class of 1990.

Boxing career

Journeyman
Basilio began his professional boxing career by facing Jimmy Evans on November 24, 1948 in Binghamton, New York. He knocked Evans out in the third round, and five days later he beat Bruce Walters in only one round. By the end of 1948, he had completed four bouts.

He started 1949 with two draws, against Johnny Cunningham on January 5 and against Jay Perlin 20 days later. Basilio campaigned exclusively inside the state of New York during his first 24 bouts, going 19-3-2 during that span.  His first loss was at the hands of Connie Thies, who beat him in a six-round decision on 2 May 1949. He fought Cunningham three more times during that period. Basilio won by knockout in two rounds on their second meeting, Cunningham won by a decision in eight in their third fight, and Basilio won by a decision in eight in their fourth.

In the middle of that 24-bout span, 1950 rolled over and Basilio met former world champion Lew Jenkins, winning a 10-round decision.

For fight number 25, Basilio decided that it was time to campaign outside of New York state, so he went to New Orleans, where he boxed his next six fights. In his first bout there, he met Gaby Farland, who held him to a draw. He and Farland later had a rematch, Basilio winning by a knockout in the first round. He also boxed Guillermo Giminez there twice, first beating him by knockout in eight and then by knockout in nine. In his last fight before returning home, he lost by a decision in 10 to Eddie Giosa.

For his next seven bouts, Basilio only went 3-3-1, but he was able to avenge his loss to Giosa by winning a ten-round decision over him in Syracuse.

In 1952, Basilio went 6-2-1. He beat Jimmy Cousins among others that year, but he lost to Chuck Davey and Billy Graham. The draw he registered that year was against Davey in the first of the two meetings that year.

Rise in the ranks
In 1953. Basilio started winning big fights and rose in the welterweight division rankings. He secured his first world title fight, against Cuba's Kid Gavilán for Gavilán's world welterweight championship.

Before fighting against Gavilan, he beat former world lightweight champion Ike Williams and had two more fights with Graham, avenging his earlier loss to Graham in the second bout between them with a 12-round decision win and drawing in the third. Basilio lost a 15-round decision to Gavilan and went for a fourth meeting with Cunningham, this time winning by a knockout in four. Then he and French fighter Pierre Langois began another rivalry with a 10-round draw in the first bout between the two.

In 1954, Basilio went undefeated in eight bouts, going 7-0-1 with 2 knockouts and defeating Langois in their rematch by decision.

World Champion
In 1955, Basilio began by beating Peter Müller by decision. After that, Basilio was once again the number one challenger, and on June 10 of that year he received his second world title try, against world welterweight champion Tony DeMarco. Basilio became world champion by knocking out DeMarco in the 12th round. Basilio had two non-title bouts, including a ten-round decision win over Gil Turner, before he and DeMarco met again, this time with Basilio as the defending world champion. Their second fight had exactly the same result as their first bout: Basilio won by a knockout in 12.

For his next fight, in 1956, Basilio lost the title in Chicago to Johnny Saxton by a decision in 15. Saxton's manager, mafioso Frank "Blinky" Palermo", was later jailed along with his partner Frankie Carbo for fixing fights. Basilio said of losing his title to the referees' decision: "It was like being robbed in a dark alley."  In an immediate rematch that was fought in Syracuse, Basilio regained the crown with a nine-round knockout, and then, in a rubber match, Basilio kept the belt with a knockout in two.

After that, he went up in weight and challenged ageing 36- year-old world middleweight champion Sugar Ray Robinson, in what may have been his most famous fight. He won the middleweight championship of the world by beating Robinson in a 15-round split decision on September 23, 1957. The day after, he had to abandon the welterweight belt, in accordance with boxing's then rules. In 1957 Basilio won the Hickok Belt as top professional athlete of the year.

Decline

In 1958, he and Robinson met in a rematch on March 25 and Robinson barely regained the title with a controversial 15-round split decision.  Although Basilio's left eye was totally swollen shut from the 6th round on, many of the ringside press thought Basilio won the fight.  

From that moment, and until his retirement in 1961, he fought only sporadically, but three of his last fights were attempts to recover the world middleweight title, losing twice to Gene Fullmer: by a TKO in 14 at San Francisco and by a TKO in 12 in Fullmer's home state of Utah (in Salt Lake City), and also later, when he lost a 10-round decision to defending world champion Paul Pender.

In between those fights, he was able to beat Art Aragon, by knockout in eight and former world welterweight champion Don Jordan by decision in ten. His fight with Pender for the title was also his last fight as a professional boxer.

Basilio retired with a ring record of 56 wins, 16 losses and 7 draws, with 27 wins by knockout.

Post-boxing life
After his retirement, Basilio worked for a time at the Genesee Brewery in Rochester, NY. Later Carmen, a high-school dropout, taught physical education at Le Moyne College in Syracuse. Basilio, who was also a member of the United States Marine Corps at one point in his life, was able to enjoy his retirement. Carmen was associated with a sausage company, frequently confused with a separate sausage company run by his brother Paul, for which he was a salesman.

During the 1970s, his nephew Billy Backus became world welterweight champion after having a shaky start to his own boxing career, and Basilio declared on the day that Backus became champion that, to him, Billy's winning the title was better than his winning it himself.

In 1990, Ed Brophy decided to build the International Boxing Hall Of Fame in Canastota, New York, to honor the two world champions who were born there: Basilio and his nephew. Although Backus isn't a member of the Hall Of Fame, Basilio is, along with many of the fighters he met inside the ring.

In the late 1990s, Basilio became seriously ill, requiring triple bypass heart surgery. Doctors were able to repair his heart.

Basilio was interviewed for an HBO documentary on Sugar Ray Robinson called "The Bright Lights and Dark Shadows of a Champion". He mentioned that although he respected Robinson's talents in the ring, he did not like him as a person.

In 2010, "Title Town USA, Boxing in Upstate New York" by historian Mark Allen Baker was published by The History Press in 2010 and identifies Canastota as the epicenter of Upstate New York's rich boxing heritage. The book includes chapters on both Carmen Basilio  and Billy Backus. The introduction was written by Edward P. Brophy Executive Director of the International Boxing Hall of Fame. He died aged 85 in 2012, and is survived by his wife Josephine Basilio.

Championships and accomplishments
 Cauliflower Alley Club
 Boxing Honoree (1994)

Professional boxing record

See also
List of welterweight boxing champions
List of middleweight boxing champions
List of left-handed boxers

References

External links
 

 Eastside Boxing
 Carmen Basilio's bio at the Internet Movie Database
Carmen Basilio interviewed by Mike Wallace on The Mike Wallace Interview October 26, 1957
 N.Y. Times Obituary for Carmen Basilio
Strange Days: The Johnny Saxton Story, The Cruelest Sport
 https://boxrec.com/media/index.php/National_Boxing_Association%27s_Quarterly_Ratings:_1953
 https://boxrec.com/media/index.php/National_Boxing_Association%27s_Quarterly_Ratings:_1955
 https://boxrec.com/media/index.php/National_Boxing_Association%27s_Quarterly_Ratings:_1956
 https://boxrec.com/media/index.php/National_Boxing_Association%27s_Quarterly_Ratings:_1957
 https://boxrec.com/media/index.php/National_Boxing_Association%27s_Quarterly_Ratings:_1958

1927 births
2012 deaths
Boxers from New York (state)
American people of Italian descent
Middleweight boxers
Welterweight boxers
World boxing champions
International Boxing Hall of Fame inductees
United States Marines
Deaths from pneumonia  in New York (state)
People from Canastota, New York
American male boxers